ALTV (Active Learning Television) is a Thai educational television channel operated by ThaiPBS, which strives to promote learning and the integration of teaching between home and school.

In May 2020, Thai PBS submitted a proposal to the National Broadcasting and Telecommunications Commission to operate a new educational digital television channel. Thai PBS has been granted to operate a new digital TV channel for 6 months.

ALTV launched on 1 July 2020 in digital, satellite television and online platforms.

Programming Themes 
ALTV broadcasts educational television programs for viewers of all ages, which are classified into 6 categories.

 Active Learning News : Learning news program
 Homeroom Home-Run : Life and education guidance program
 Smart Classroom : Interactive learning for specific skill
 Farm Roo : Learning through outdoor activities
 Tutor Hub : Re-skill & Partnership relation
 Knowledge Pool : Documentary & Edutainment for practical experience

See also
Thai PBS
List of television stations in Thailand
Media of Thailand

References

External links 
 Official Website

Television stations in Thailand
Educational and instructional television channels
Television channels and stations established in 2020